A custom of the sea is a custom that is said to be practiced by the officers and crew of ships and boats in the open sea, as distinguished from maritime law, which is a distinct and coherent body of law that governs maritime questions and offenses.

Among these customs is the practice of cannibalism among shipwrecked survivors, by the drawing of lots to see who is to be killed and eaten so that the others might survive.

Historical examples of "agreed" cannibalism

Saint Christopher case
In the early 17th century, seven Englishmen in the Caribbean embarked on an overnight voyage from Saint Christopher Island, but were blown out to sea and lost for 17 days. During this time, starving, they cast lots to see who would sacrifice his own life for the others. The lot fell to the man who had suggested the scheme, and he consented to his subsequent killing. His body sustained the rest until they made their way to Saint Martin. They were returned to Saint Christopher where they were put on trial for homicide. The judge pardoned them, their crime being "washed away" by "inevitable necessity". 

This case's first detailed summary in high-brow British publications was in a post-1884 medical work, not in any law reports.

Essex
After a whale rammed and sank the whaling ship Essex of Nantucket on 20 November 1820, the survivors were left floating in three small whaleboats. They eventually resorted, by common consent, to cannibalism to allow some to survive. Of the seven crew eaten, six died of starvation and exposure; one, Owen Coffin, lost a lottery, and was shot. The captain volunteered to take Coffin's place but Coffin refused, saying it was his 'right' to do so that the others might live.

Mignonette

The case of R v Dudley and Stephens (1884 14 QBD 273 DC) is an English case which developed a crucial ruling on necessity in modern common law. The case dealt with four crewmembers of an English yacht, the Mignonette, who were shipwrecked in a storm some 1,600 miles from the Cape of Good Hope. After a few weeks adrift in a lifeboat, 17 year old crewmate Richard Parker fell unconscious due to a combination of hunger and drinking seawater. The others (one abstaining) decided then to kill him and eat him. They were picked up four days later. The case held that necessity was not a defense for a charge of murder, and the two defendants were convicted, though their death sentence was commuted to six months' imprisonment. This case has eerie similarities with Edgar Allan Poe's only novel, The Narrative of Arthur Gordon Pym of Nantucket (1838) as both people cannibalised shared the exact same name.

Fictional references in literature
Edgar Allan Poe's only novel, The Narrative of Arthur Gordon Pym of Nantucket (1838), has a minor character, Richard Parker, who is cannibalised by the shipwreck's survivors.

In 1866, W.S. Gilbert wrote a song, "The Yarn of the Nancy Bell", in which the last survivor of shipwreck sings that he is the entire crew after drawing lots and eating his other shipmates.

The stories of Richard Parker (real and fictional) inspired the name of the tiger in Yann Martel's novel Life of Pi, in which cannibalism is discussed in relation to a shipwreck.

The 2019 movie Harpoon, in which three friends are stranded aboard their yacht at sea, references both the incident aboard the Mignonette and the Edgar Allen Poe story. One of the characters is also named Richard Parker.

See also

Barratry (admiralty law)
Man overboard
Mutiny
The captain goes down with the ship
Women and children first

References

Further reading

Cannibalism
Customary legal systems